Rhodostrophia ferruginaria is a moth of the family Geometridae. It is found in Chile.

References

Moths described in 1852
Rhodostrophiini
Endemic fauna of Chile